MDI (formerly known as Men's Divisions International) is a mutual benefit not-for-profit organization that has been active in the United States and Canada since 2000.  The organization's focuses are on the "strengths and sorrows its men face.  Trying to improve their connections to friends, families, work places, and communities."

History
In the late 1980s small groups of men, volunteers part of the Sterling Institute, recognized and became dissatisfied with the nature of that organization and formed an "arm's length" group called The Men's Divisions, a separate and masculine entity in its own right. It must be stated that although "separate", the Men's Divisions continued to support Justin Sterling and the Sterling Institute of Relationship, all of which were for-profit organizations supporting Justin Sterling.  They continued this relationship throughout the rest of the 1980s and most of the 1990s. Between 1998 and 2000, the volunteer leadership, with the help of a number of other key volunteers, completely broke away [reference or clarification needed] from Sterling and his Institute, forming the independent volunteer organization of Men's Divisions International.  International was added to the name to recognize the fact that they have always existed in both Canada and the United States.  They soon attained not-for-profit status only in the USA    and created their own Weekend event for Men, called the Legacy Discovery Event.  They still are and own the rights to Men's Divisions International, but in 2010, officially adopted the name of just "MDI".

Structure and Organization
The basic unit in MDI is a Men's Team, a relatively small group of men who meet on a regular, usually weekly, basis.

The Teams are grouped in Divisions, and the Divisions are grouped in Regions.  There are currently five regions in MDI:  Canada, Northeast, Southeast, Southwest, and Western. In 2019, because of declining membership, the MidAtlantic and New England Regions were combined into the Northeast Region.

Members typically start their leadership training as a team leader, and progress into larger areas of responsibility, such as division leader, regional leader, international leader, etc. The emphasis of the training is to give each volunteer the experience and leadership training required to take on similar responsibilities within his community, employment, or family.

Although MDI has an elected board of directors and executives, the names of MDI's leaders are not listed on its website.

Activities
In addition to weekly meetings, the teams and divisions within MDI often engage in community service activities in their communities.  For example, in 2004, men from the Southwestern region of MDI worked to beautify a children's emergency shelter in Long Beach, California.

On the first Sunday of every December, the Veterans Department of Voluntary Services, VA VGLA, MDI, along with over 500 volunteers and local businesses, come together as one. This union of men and women helps maintain memorable meals, gifts, and entertainment, as well as much needed appreciation.

The men of MDl are regular volunteers for Big Sunday which is the largest annual citywide community service event in America. These men work alongside volunteers of every age to help hundreds of non-profits, schools and other agencies.

Until 2012, during the second week of October MDI held its annual convention in Las Vegas, Nevada.  The convention included dozens of seminars on a variety of issues from leadership, family, money, community building and relationship.  The convention was open to any man. The 2011 Annual MDI Convention was held at the Rio All Suites Hotel on October 21–24. The 2012 Convention was held at the Rio October 11–15.

References

[This description of MDI applies to the USA organization. Canada's organization is not registered as a non-profit with the CRA (see the CRA website),and functions more as an informal club with events mirroring those that the American groups organize)but without the legal status.

Men's movement